Cajamarca Province is a province of the Cajamarca Region in Peru. The capital of the province is Cajamarca.

Geography 
Other mountains are listed below:

Political division 
The province measures  and is divided into twelve districts:

See also
 Mamaqucha
 Qillwaqucha
 Quyllur
 Sulluqucha

References 
  Instituto Nacional de Estadística e Informática. Banco de Información Digital. Retrieved November 4, 2007.

Provinces of the Cajamarca Region